Three Wise Girls is a 1932 American pre-Code romantic drama film directed by William Beaudine and featuring Jean Harlow in her first starring role.  The supporting cast features a young Andy Devine. This film is preserved in the Library of Congress collection.

Plot
A young small-town woman heads to New York City, where she and her two friends have romantic troubles.

Cast
 Jean Harlow as Cassie Barnes
 Mae Clarke as Gladys Kane
 Marie Prevost as Dot
 Walter Byron as Jerry Dexter
 Andy Devine as Jimmy Callahan
 Natalie Moorhead as Ruth Dexter
 Jameson Thomas as Arthur Phelps
 Lucy Beaumont as Mrs. Barnes
 Kathrin Clare Ward as Mrs. Kane
 Robert Dudley as Lem
 Marcia Harris as Landlady
 Walter Miller as Manager of Drugstore
 Armand Kaliz as Andre

Reviews
Variety Tuesday, February 9, 1932

"While the title might suggest an effort to adapt 'The Greeks Had a 
Word for Them,' this is based on a far older foundation which has been 
used at least once or twice each season for the past several years. 
Still seems to possess an appeal and stands a chance of reaching 
further down the line than the more sophisticated yarns because 
it essays to point a moral."

Variety Tuesday, February 16, 1932

"Jean Harlow has often expressed a longing to play a 'good girl' In 
pictures, 'Three Wise Girls' (Beacon) grants her wish. In it she's 
just as good as good can be. But a good girl to picture audiences 
has to do more than act that way; she's got to look that way. 
However, it is a physical impossibility for Miss Harlow to assume 
the straight ascetic outlines which are the basis of virtue; 
to film audiences, her contours and manner of displaying them 
will never allow her to sneak into the good girl category no matter 
how sincerely she longs for it. 
Mae Clarke, who looks like a good girl and is cast for a bad one,
and Marie Prevost, who doesn't aspire for a millionaire, but is
happy with a chauffeur and a wedding band, complete the trio of girls 
laughingly called 'Wise' in this pleasant little yarn's title."

References

External links

 
 
 
 

1932 films
American romantic drama films
American black-and-white films
Columbia Pictures films
Films directed by William Beaudine
Films set in New York City
1932 romantic drama films
1930s English-language films
1930s American films